Český Rudolec is a municipality and village in Jindřichův Hradec District in the South Bohemian Region of the Czech Republic. It has about 900 inhabitants.

Administrative parts
Villages of Horní Radíkov, Lipnice, Markvarec, Matějovec, Nová Ves, Nový Svět, Radíkov, Rožnov and Stoječín are administrative parts of Český Rudolec.

References

Villages in Jindřichův Hradec District